The men's aerials event in freestyle skiing at the 2018 Winter Olympics took place on 17 and 18 February 2018 at the Bogwang Phoenix Park, Pyeongchang, South Korea.

Qualification

The top 25 athletes in the Olympic quota allocation list qualified, with a maximum of four athletes per National Olympic Committee (NOC) allowed. All athletes qualifying must also have placed in the top 30 FIS World Cup event or FIS Freestyle World Ski Championships during the qualification period (1 July 2016 to 21 January 2018) and also have a minimum of 80 FIS points to compete. If the host country, South Korea at the 2018 Winter Olympics did not qualify, their chosen athlete would displace the last qualified athlete, granted all qualification criterion was met.

Results

Qualification
The qualification was held on 17 February at 20:00.

Qualification 2
The qualification was held on 17 February at 20:45.

Finals
The final was held on 18 February at 20:00.

References

Men's freestyle skiing at the 2018 Winter Olympics